Teosa Assembly constituency is one of the 288 constituencies of Maharashtra Vidhan Sabha and one of the eight present in Amravati district.

Teosa is a part of the Vidhan Sabha assembly constituencies along with five other, viz. Badnera, Amravati, Daryapur (SC), Melghat (ST) and Achalpur.

The remaining two Dhamangaon Railway and Morshi constituencies are part of Wardha (Lok Sabha constituency) in adjoining Wardha district.

As per orders of Delimitation of Parliamentary and Assembly constituencies Order, 2008, No. 39 Teosa Assembly constituency is composed of the following: 1. Teosa Tehsil, 2. Morshi Tehsil (Part), Revenue Circle - Ner Pinglai and Dhamangaon, 3. Amravati Tehsil (Part), Revenue Circle - Shirala, Mahuli Jahangir, Nandgaon Peth and Walgaon and 4. Bhatkuli Tehsil (Part), Revenue Circle – Ashti and Kholapur of the Amravati district.

Members of Vidhan Sabha

Notes

Assembly constituencies of Maharashtra